Love You Hamesha is an Indian Hindi-language romance film written and directed by Kailash Surendranath. It stars Akshaye Khanna and Sonali Bendre as its main cast, and other supporting actors. The film was stuck in the cans and remained unreleased for over 20 years. Sonali Bendre called her role in this film one of her best roles. The film was finally released on 7 July 2022 on YouTube on NMP Movies Channel.

Plot
The story revolves around young people in their early 20s coming of age. Trouble follows a young woman (Sonali Bendre) when she breaks her engagement to a mismatched man (Amitabh Nanda)and falls in love with someone else (Akshaye Khanna), whom she meets after running away from home. A search for her is initiated by the woman's father. Things take a turn when her father conspires to ruin the relationship between the duo.

Cast 
Akshaye Khanna as Shaurat
Sonali Bendre as Shivani
Amitabh Nanda as Samrat
Rohit Bal as himself
Rishma Malik
Dalip Tahil
Vijayendra Ghatge
Riya Sen as Meghna

Production
The film began production in 1999, but had not released as of April 2003. Elle editor Amitabh Nanda made his foray into acting with this film. Fashion designer Rohit Bal played himself in the film. The film was is primarily shot in exotic locales in Rajasthan and a song sequence in Andaman Islands. The film was originally scheduled to be released in 2001. Due to unknown reasons the film was not released to mainstream public. The soundtrack composed by A.R. Rahman was released in April 2001 and two music videos were released on mainstream TV channels and YouTube.

Soundtrack

The soundtrack has six songs and was dubbed from the Tamil film May Maadham released in 1994. The composer of the songs is A.R. Rahman with lyrics by Anand Bakshi. The soundtrack by A.R. Rahman was released to positive reviews and was received better than most Hindi films in 2001. A. R. Rahman has been said to have given fantastic music for the film.
"Gup Chup Baatein" – Hariharan, Sadhna Sargam
"Botal Tod De – " – Hema Sardesai, Sonu Nigam
"Sone Ka Palang" – Ila Arun, Kavita Paudwal, Udit Narayan
"Yaar Teri Bewafaai " – Mahalaxmi Iyer
"Ek Ladki Thi " – Kavita Krishnamurthy
"Love You Hamesha" – Sonu Nigam, Shweta Shetty, G. V. Prakash

References

External links
 

2001 films
2000s Hindi-language films
Indian romantic musical films
1990s Hindi-language films
1990s romantic musical films
1990s musical drama films
Indian musical drama films
Films scored by A. R. Rahman
Indian direct-to-video films
Rediscovered Indian films
2000s rediscovered films